American Machinists' Handbook was a McGraw-Hill reference book similar to Industrial Press's Machinery's Handbook. (The latter title, still in print and regularly revised, is the one that machinists today are usually referring to when they speak imprecisely of "the machinist's handbook" or "the machinists' handbook".)

The somewhat generic sound of the title American Machinists' Handbook, no doubt contributed to the confounding of the two books' titles and identities. It capitalized on readers' familiarity with American Machinist, McGraw-Hill's popular trade journal. But the usage could have benefited from some branding discipline, because of some little confusion over whether the title was properly "American Machinist's Handbook" or "American Machinists' Handbook". ("American Machinist 's Handbook" would be parallel to the construction of the title "Machinery's Handbook")

McGraw-Hill's American Machinists' Handbook appeared first (1908). It is doubtful that Industrial Press's Machinery's Handbook (1914) was a mere me-too conceived afterwards in response. The eager market for such reference works had probably been obvious for at least a decade before either work was compiled, perhaps the appearance of the McGraw-Hill title merely prodded Industrial Press to finally get moving on a handbook of its own.

American Machinists' Handbook, co-edited by Fred H. Colvin and Frank A. Stanley, went through eight editions between 1908 and 1945. In 1955, McGraw-Hill published The new American machinist's handbook. Based upon earlier editions of American machinists' handbook, but perhaps the book did not compete well enough with Machinery's Handbook. No subsequent editions were produced.

List of the editions of American Machinists' Handbook

Renewal data from Rutgers. All works after 1923 with renewed copyright are presumably still protected.

1908 non-fiction books
Mechanical engineering
Metallurgical industry of the United States
Handbooks and manuals
McGraw-Hill books